The Flores woolly bat (Kerivoula flora) is a species of vesper bat in the family Vespertilionidae.

Distribution
It is found in Indonesia and Malaysia.  The distribution of this species is believed in Borneo,  Bali, the Lesser Sunda Islands, and Sumba. Possibly the same or a very similar species can be found in Kon Kha Kinh and Pu Mat, Vietnam.

The species is primarily dependent on forests, undergone a 30% population decline over the last ten years, in the lesser Sundras.

References

Kerivoulinae
Bats of Indonesia
Bats of Malaysia
Fauna of the Lesser Sunda Islands
Fauna of Bali
Mammals of Borneo
Vulnerable fauna of Asia
Taxonomy articles created by Polbot
Taxa named by Oldfield Thomas
Mammals described in 1914